The Washington Nationals are a United States Major League Baseball franchise based in Washington, D.C.

Franchise records
What follows are the Washington Nationals/Montreal Expos team records. Records before 2005 are by Montreal Expos, records from 2005 are by Washington Nationals.

Single season records

Batting
 Batting Average: Juan Soto, .351 (2020)
 On-base Percentage: Juan Soto, .490 (2020)
 Slugging Percentage: Juan Soto, .695 (2020)
 OPS: Juan Soto, 1.185 (2020)
 At Bats: Trea Turner, 664 (2018)
 Runs: Tim Raines, 133 (1983)
 Hits: Vladimir Guerrero, 206 (2002)
 Total Bases: Vladimir Guerrero, 379 (2000)
 Doubles: Mark Grudzielanek, 54 (1997)
 Home Runs: Alfonso Soriano, 46 (2006)
 Runs Batted In: Vladimir Guerrero, 131 (1999)
 Walks: Juan Soto, 145 (2021)
 Strikeouts: Danny Espinosa, 189 (2012)
 Stolen Bases: Ron LeFlore, 97 (1980)
 Singles: Mark Grudzielanek, 157 (1996)
 Runs Created: Bryce Harper, 161 (2015)
 Extra-Base Hits: Vladimir Guerrero, 84 (1999)
 Times on Base: Juan Soto, 304 (2021)
 Hit By Pitch: Ron Hunt, 50 (1971)
 Sacrifice Hits: Larry Lintz, 23 (1974)
 Sacrifice Flies: Andre Dawson, 18 (1983)
 Intentional Walks: Vladimir Guerrero, 32 (2002)
 At Bats per Strikeout: Gary Sutherland, 25.3 (1971)
 At Bats per Home Run: Bryce Harper, 12.4 (2015)

Pitching
 ERA: Pedro Martínez, 1.90 (1997)
 Wins: Gio González, 21 (2012)
 Won-Loss %: Bryn Smith, .782 (1985)
 WHIP: Max Scherzer, 0.902 (2017)
 Games: Mike Marshall, 92 (1973)
 Saves: Chad Cordero, 47 (2005)
 Innings: Steve Rogers, 301 ⅔ (1977)
 Strikeouts: Pedro Martínez, 305 (1997)
 Games Started: Steve Rogers, 40 (1977)
 Complete Games: Bill Stoneman, 19 (1971)
 Walks Allowed: Bill Stoneman, 146 (1971)
 Hits Allowed: Carl Morton, 281 (1970)
 Strikeout to Walk: Max Scherzer, 8.11 (2015)
 Losses: Steve Rogers, 22 (1974)
 Earned Runs Allowed: Steve Rogers, 126 (1974)
 Wild Pitches: Steve Renko, 19 (1974)
 Hit Batsmen: Ramón Ortiz, 18 (2006)
 Batters Faced: Bill Stoneman, 1,243 (1971)
 Games Finished: Mike Marshall, 73 (1973)

Career records

† minimum of 2000 plate appearances
‡ minimum of 500 innings pitched

References

Records
Washington Nationals
Montreal Expos